Michael Paul Holland (born 1964) is a retired United States Navy rear admiral who most recently served as the Chief of Staff of the United States Northern Command. Previously, he was the Director of Programming of the United States Navy. Holland earned a bachelor's degree from Montana State University in 1987.

References

External links

1964 births
Living people
Place of birth missing (living people)
Montana State University alumni
United States submarine commanders
United States Navy admirals